John Thomas Athawes  (8 December 1837 – 3 October 1915) was an English first-class cricketer and clergyman.

Personal life & education
The son of The Reverend John Athawes, he was born in December 1837 at Loughton, Buckinghamshire. He was educated at Winchester College, before going up to Clare College, Cambridge. 
After graduating from Cambridge, Athawes took holy orders in the Anglican Church in 1862, being ordained as a deacon. He took his curacy at Loughton in the same year, which he held until 1864. For the next three years he held the curacy at East Hendred. Athawes was appointed the headmaster of St John's Middle School at Kennington in 1867, a post he remained in until 1881. He spent 1882 in Italy as a chaplain at Bologna. Athawes returned to Loughton in 1883 to take up the post of reverend, which he held until his death at Loughton at Tenbury Wells in October 1915. Beside his ecclesiastical duties, Athawes was the diocesan inspector of schools for Oxford and was a justice of the peace for Buckinghamshire. He was also chairman of both the Newport Pagnell Board of Guardians and the Rural District Council.

Cricket career
He did not play cricket while attending Winchester, but did play for Cambridge University Cricket Club in minor matches. However, while studying at Cambridge he did make a single appearance in first-class cricket for the Marylebone Cricket Club (MCC) against Cambridge University at Fenner's in 1860. He batted once in the match, opening the batting in the MCC first innings and scoring 12 runs, before being dismissed by Edward Fawcett.

References

External links

1837 births
1915 deaths
People educated at Winchester College
Alumni of Clare College, Cambridge
English cricketers
Marylebone Cricket Club cricketers
19th-century English Anglican priests
Heads of schools in London
20th-century English Anglican priests
English justices of the peace